Sieraków Śląski is a village in the administrative district of Gmina Ciasna, within Lubliniec County, Silesian Voivodeship, in southern Poland.

The village has a population of 1,704 (2008).

References

Villages in Lubliniec County